The 2002 Lehigh Mountain Hawks football team was an American football team that represented Lehigh University during the 2002 NCAA Division I-AA football season. Lehigh finished fourth in the Patriot League. 

In their second year under head coach Pete Lembo, the Mountain Hawks compiled an 8–4 record. Matt Salvaterra and Jeff Santacroce were the team captains.

The Mountain Hawks outscored opponents 319 to 216. Their 4–3 conference record placed fourth out of eight in the Patriot League standings. The fourth-place finish broke a four-year streak of conference championships for Lehigh. 

Lehigh was ranked No. 6 in the preseason national Division I-AA poll, and remained ranked until the final game of the season. The Mountain Hawks' ranking peaked at No. 2 in the poll released September 10 (a bye week for Lehigh), but scattered losses throughout the year saw the team drop steadily. Following their rivalry loss to Lafayette, the Mountain Hawks were unranked in the season-ending poll, and did not participate in the national playoffs for the first time since 1997.

Lehigh played its home games at Goodman Stadium on the university's Goodman Campus in Bethlehem, Pennsylvania.

Schedule

References

Lehigh
Lehigh Mountain Hawks football seasons
Lehigh Mountain Hawks football